The fourth season of the American political comedy television series Veep premiered on April 12, 2015, on HBO in the United States. It consists of ten episodes each running approximately 28 minutes. The season's showrunner and series creator Armando Iannucci exited at the conclusion of the season.

Season four follows Selina Meyer in the role of President after her predecessor steps down to care for his wife. She attempts to pass a landmark bill supporting working mothers while navigating her presidential campaign, overseen by top campaign manager Bill Ericsson, portrayed by Diedrich Bader. Two of her staffers, Amy and Dan, abruptly exit the White House and begin work as lobbyists. Eventually, Selina is forced to choose a new running mate when Andrew Doyle unexpectedly drops out of the role. She chooses Senator Tom James, played by Hugh Laurie, whose popularity and political machinations come to irk her. After a campaign data breach puts her in jeopardy, Selina's team scapegoats Ericsson. The season finale centers on the night of the election, which concludes with an electoral college tie between Selina and her opponent, Senator Bill O'Brien. 

The season received critical acclaim and was assigned a 90/100 on Metacritic. It received five Primetime Emmy Awards, including Outstanding Comedy Series, the second premium cable series to win the award. Julia Louis-Dreyfus received her fourth Primetime Emmy Award for Outstanding Lead Actress in a Comedy Series for Veep, and Tony Hale received his second Primetime Emmy Award for Outstanding Supporting Actor in a Comedy Series.

Plot 
The fourth season follows Selina Meyer stepping into the role of president after President Hughes steps down to take care of his depressed wife. Selina's staffers' incompetence ruins her first State of the Union address by failing to load her completed speech on the teleprompter. She is determined to author a bill that will benefit working moms called Families First, although her team advises against it. 

Gary struggles with his reduced role as Selina's bag man. Selina confronts Gary for ordering expensive decorations for a state dinner, and they reconcile after a screaming argument. 

Her vice president, Andrew Doyle hires a chief of staff, Teddy, who continually sexually harasses Jonah. Jonah eventually reports the behavior and Teddy is fired.

Meanwhile, Amy manages Selina's presidential campaign in an unofficial capacity, and is frustrated when Selina hires the best political campaign manager in Washington, Bill Ericsson. Her campaign catches negative press attention after a data breach reveals the identity of an HIV-positive elementary school student. First a White House aide, Leigh, and then Dan are fired as scapegoats for the data breach. Dan goes to work for Sidney Purcell at a consulting firm.

When Andrew Doyle unexpectedly bows out of her ticket at the party's political convention, Selina's team scrambles to find a new running mate. Amy quits in frustration because of Selina's equivocating friend and new adviser, Karen Collins. After Amy leaves, Selina heeds her suggestion to ask Tom James to be her running mate. It is later revealed that Selina previously had romantic feelings for Tom. Dan gets Amy a job at his consulting firm, but Amy has difficulty managing her anger about her time in the White House.

After Selina's team successfully convinces her that the Families First bill is too big a political liability, they scramble to get the votes needed to make sure it will fail. A flu-ridden Selina directs their activities while sick in bed. Gary publicly meets with Dan and Amy and agrees to pay them to lobby against the bill. The episode "Testimony" depicts the staffers undergoing congressional hearings regarding the campaign's data breach, during which they each scapegoat Bill Ericsson. Selina takes steps to end Catherine's engagement to Jason, a 35-year-old political consultant. 

The season finale ("Election Night") follows Selina and her team on election night. Jonah and Richard manage the Meyer-James rally, and Jonah turns his debacle with Teddy into a testicular health awareness campaign. Her running mate, Tom James, requests that she make him Treasury Secretary in addition to vice president if they win. After poor results prompt Selina to nearly concede, she and O'Brien tie for electoral college votes (269 each), which triggers the 20th Amendment and an impending vote by the House of Representatives. The episode discusses the possibility that in the case of another tie, the vice president of the Senate would become president, who happens to be her running mate, Tom James.

Cast and characters

Main 
 Julia Louis-Dreyfus as Selina Meyer 
 Anna Chlumsky as Amy Brookheimer 
 Tony Hale as Gary Walsh
 Reid Scott as Dan Egan
 Timothy Simons as Jonah Ryan
 Matt Walsh as Mike McLintock 
 Sufe Bradshaw as Sue Wilson 
 Kevin Dunn as Ben Cafferty 
 Gary Cole as Kent Davison 
 Sam Richardson as Richard Splett

Recurring 
 Sarah Sutherland as Catherine Meyer
 David Pasquesi as Andrew Meyer
 Kathy Najimy as Wendy Keegan
 Dan Bakkedahl as Congressman Roger Furlong
 Nelson Franklin as Will
 David Rasche as Speaker Jim Marwood
 Paul Fitzgerald as Congressman Owen Pierce
 Phil Reeves as Senator Andrew Doyle
 Patton Oswalt as Teddy Sykes
 Brad Leland as Senator Bill O'Brien
 Hugh Laurie as Senator Tom James
 Diedrich Bader as Bill Ericsson
 Peter Grosz as Sidney Purcell
 Brian Huskey as Leon West
 Jessie Ennis as Leigh Patterson
 Lennon Parham as Karen Collins
 Randall Park as Minnesota Governor Danny Chung
 Isiah Whitlock Jr. as General George Maddox

Episodes

Production 
The series creator Armando Iannucci departed as showrunner at the end of the season, "citing the toll producing a series in the U.S. has taken on Iannucci and his London-based family." Additional executive producers for the season were Christopher Godsick, Frank Rich, Chris Addison, Becky Martin, Stephanie Laing, Simon Blackwell, Tony Roche, and Julia Louis-Dreyfus. 

Iannucci is credited as story co-writer for every episode. Directors for the season included Addison, Martin, Laing, and Iannucci.

Release 
The first episode of the season aired on April 12, 2015, on HBO and new episodes aired every Sunday until its finale on June 14, 2015.

Reception 
Season four of Veep received critical acclaim. It received a 90/100 on review aggregator Metacritic, and a 100% on Rotten Tomatoes with the critical consensus: "Veep shows no signs of slowing down in its fourth season, thanks to sharp, funny, rapid-fire dialogue between POTUS and her hilariously incompetent staff."

Departing creator and showrunner Armando Iannucci was praised for the season by Newsweek, who called it the "funniest season yet." The acting and writing were received well, as in The Hollywood Reporter's review by Tim Goodman: "Veep enters its fourth season firmly established as one of television's best comedies, and then immediately does what seems impossible: It delivers its most thoroughly assured, hilarious and brilliantly written and acted episodes."

Matt Zoller Seitz wrote in Vulture of the titular character's acting: "Louis-Dreyfus is her usual Swiss-watch self, so confident that she seems to glide through her scenes." The comedic duo of Louis-Dreyfus and Tony Hale was also applauded; Ben Travers described them in IndieWire: "The duo’s chemistry continues to drive entire episodes with a few short moments, and if they’re kept apart too long, the rest of the team is there to fill gaps faster than you can spot them."

In a less positive review, Variety's Brian Lowry wrote "The series also remains a bit too precious in sidestepping issues of partisanship, a conceit that has grown somewhat more tolerable over time." David Hinckley of the New York Daily News also noted, "if you don't find awkward funny, you won't get "Veep.""

Veep was called the most accurate depiction of American politics by Dan Pfeiffer for Grantland, who stated that the show captures "the humanity, the banality, and the absurdity" of Washington D.C. He further stated: "The fact that real-life Washington loves the show but often doesn’t seem to truly get the joke may be the show’s most devastating critique of all."

Awards and nominations

References

External links 
 
 

2015 American television seasons
Veep (TV series)